Zombivli is a 2022 Indian Marathi-language Zombie-comedy film directed by Aditya Sarpotdar. The film stars Lalit Prabhakar, Vaidehi Parshurami, Amey Wagh and Trupti Khamkar in lead roles. It was released in theaters on 26 January 2022 and aired on ZEE5 on 20 May 2022.

Plot
Vishwas (Lalit Prabhakar) is a firebrand local leader from Janata Nagar, Dombivli, who is fiercely proud of his community and objects to anyone casting slander against the residents from his community. He aids in carrying a sick man to a hospital, only to find the hospital crowded with people suffering similar symptoms. The patients are unresponsive to the medication, and a patient staggers out of the hospital, exhibiting zomboid behaviour.

Sudhir (Amey Wagh) is an engineer working at a local bottling company, owned by a shady local leader Appa Musale (Vijay Nikam). He lives in an apartment next to Janata Nagar with his pregnant wife, Seema (Vaidehi Parshurami). On his first day at work, he encounters Vishwas, who is protesting against the bottling companies unfair policies depriving local residents of their rightful share of water.

Meanwhile, the zombie epidemic begins spreading through town. Sudhir is almost being bitten by a zombie when running an errand, but Vishwas's timely intervention saves him. A panicked Sudhir lodges a report at the Police Station, causing Vishwas to be picked up and detained.

Sudhir attempts to discover the source of the epidemic by looking through the PCB (Pollution Control Board) files, but is forestalled by his boss, who asks him to meet Musale. At a party hosted by Musale, the latter warns Sudhir to not pry into affairs not concerning him.

As Sudhir returns home, the zombies attack the Police Station, and Vishwas, taking advantage of the chaos, makes good his escape and heads towards Janata Nagar. Sudhir returns home in his car, but is attacked by zombies. Vishwas and Sudhir meet Seema and her maid Malti (Trupti Khamkar) who were out shopping at the time, and manage to escape in the nick of time along with a couple of other residents, including Bhide (a senior citizen) and Rajendra (an arrogant flat owner) in a journalist's car when Sudhir's car breaks down. They attempt to flee Dombivli but are prevented from doing so by a police barricade put in place by the Government to stop the infection from spreading. An altercation ensues in which Bhide is shot by the police, forcing the rest of the group to rush towards an hospital for urgent medical aid.

The group arrives at the hospital to find it completely overrun by zombies, but a doctor holed up there is able to treat Bhide's wound, leaving him weak but otherwise capable of holding up. After a brief scare in which Sudhir believes himself to be infected (but is found to be healthy), Vishwas, Sudhir, and the journalist decide to go to the source of the infection, a restricted area in the factory, which Sudhir had noticed on his first day at work. They stealthily sneak past the zombified guards and discover Musale's "immunity boosting" tablets, which left toxic wastes during manufacturing, which was allowed to leak into the local water supply due to the callous attitude of the management. Musale arrives on the scene and shoots Vishwas, but is bitten and turned into a zombie when trying to escape with the money stashed at the factory.

Meanwhile, Seema and the others attempt to escape the hospital, but are betrayed by Rajendra who harbours a prejudice against the so-called "slum-dwellers" of Janata Nagar. When a fire alarm goes off in the hospital, the zombies are showered with water, stopping them in their tracks. Seema abandons Rajendra and reaches the factory in a fire engine. Vishwas, Sudhir and the journalist, weary from fighting off zombies are struggling to hold them off when Seema and her group reach there and shower the zombies with the fire engine's hose, allowing everyone to escape.

Vishwas is elected President of a local political organization for his contribution, and Sudhir is blessed with a baby daughter. A zombie Rajendra ends up on the railway tracks where he is run over by a speeding train.

Cast 
Amey Wagh as Sudhir Joshi; Seema's Husband
Vaidehi Parashurami  as Seema Joshi; Sudhir's Wife
Lalit Prabhakar as Vishwas/ Jaggu; Slum Leader of Janata Nagar
Trupti Khamkar as Malti
Sharat Sonu as Prakash Dubey
Renuka Daftardar as Sudhir's Mother
Vighnesh Joshi as Building Resident
Tushar Khair as Doctor in Hospital
Vijay Nikam as Appa Musale; Sudhir's Boss and Builder of his Complex
Janaki Pathak as Anjali
Rajendra Shisatkar as Building Resident
Janardan Kadam as Zombie
Siddhartha Jadhav as Guest Appearance in the Song "Angaat Alaya"
Sanjay Borkar as Inspector Koli

Production

Release

Reception 
Zombivli received positive reviews from the critics for portraying the class divide during a zombie apocalypse. Mihir Bhanage of The Times of India called it "Zombie apocalypse with a dash of humour," and wrote: "The film begins on a high note and picks steam soon. However, midway, it loses steam and becomes a drag-fest before picking up pace again during the climax." Scroll.in reviewer Nandini Ramnath opined that the film was a tribute to Edgar Wright’s Shaun of the Dead. "Zombivli plays out largely as a comedy with mostly harmless bodies jerking about. It's the humans of Dombivli, including the venal Musale and Sudhir's selfish neighbours, who prove to be far more dangerous," Ramnath added.  Writing for Maharashtra Times, Kalpeshraj Kubal reviewed the technical aspects and stated: "."

Copyright issues

Filmmaker Tarun Wadhwa filed a petition in The Bombay High Court claiming that Saregama India Limited had allegedly made Zombivili using his idea, and without his permission. According to Wadhwa, he had shared the idea about the film with the Screen Writer's Association, which was shared to Saregama through Yoodlee Films, one of Saregama's divisions. Saregama then asked Wadhwa to submit a screenplay on his idea, but was told by Saregama India Limited that there was no intention of developing his concept any further. Judge Gautam Patel ruled that Wadhwa could not prove his claim, and nullified his plea to restrain the release of the film.

References

External links 
 
 Zombivili at ZEE5

2022 films
2022 comedy horror films
2020s monster movies
Indian comedy horror films
2020s Marathi-language films
Zombie comedy films
Films scored by Rohan-Rohan
Indian monster movies